David Stuart Lumsden (11 December 1877 – 14 May 1961) was a Cape Colony cricketer. He played in eleven first-class matches for Eastern Province between 1903/04 and 1909/10.

See also
 List of Eastern Province representative cricketers

References

External links
 

1877 births
1961 deaths
Cricketers from Cape Colony
Eastern Province cricketers
Cricketers from Port Elizabeth